Ctenoplana is a genus of comb jellies, and the only genus in the family Ctenoplanidae. It comprises the following species:

 Ctenoplana agnae (Dawydoff, 1929)
 Ctenoplana bengalensis Gnanamuthu and Nair, 1948 
 Ctenoplana caulleryi Dawydoff, 1936
 Ctenoplana duboscqui Dawydoff, 1929
 Ctenoplana korotneffi Willey, 1896
 Ctenoplana kowalevskii Korotneff, 1886
 Ctenoplana maculomarginata (Yoshi, 1933)
 Ctenoplana muculosa (Yoshi, 1933)
 Ctenoplana neritica Fricke & Plante, 1971
 Ctenoplana perrieri (Dawydoff, 1930)
 Ctenoplana rosacea Willey, 1896
 Ctenoplana yurii (Dawydoff, 1929)

References

External links

Ctenophore genera